Tony Pacheco may refer to:
 Tony Pacheco (1927–1987), American baseball scout
 Tony Pacheco (rugby), American rugby coach

See also
Antonio Pacheco (disambiguation)